The Margaret and Charles Juravinski Centre is a psychiatric hospital in Hamilton, Ontario.  It serves  the south-central Ontario, Canada population.  It was originally established in 1876 as the Hamilton Hospital for the Insane, which was operated by the Ontario government until it was taken over by the St. Joseph's Healthcare Hamilton in 2000.

History
Like many of the old psychiatric hospitals in Ontario, the Juravinski Centre replaced the ancient and obsolete Hamilton Psychiatric Hospital.  Remnants of a patchwork of old buildings, tunnels and monuments are still in service and serve as remembrance to days gone by.

Originally called the Hamilton Hospital for the Insane, later renamed to the Ontario Hospital and finally the Hamilton Psychiatric Hospital before transfer of operations.  The asylum began operation in 1876 with 202 patients, originally a population considered 'inebriated'.

The hospital was isolated but was mostly self-sufficient including a farm, bakery, greenhouse, butcher's shop, root cellar, tailor's shop, sewing room, fire hall, upholstery shop, power house, a bowling green, tennis courts and chapel along with a fleet of vehicles to transport the nearly 915 patients and 119 employees it housed by 1890.

At the turn of the century, the hospital commissioned a training school for psychiatric nursing and by 1956 had graduated over 240 nurses.

The Hamilton Psychiatric Hospital was owned and operated by the Ontario government for over 124 years. By November 2000, St. Joseph's Healthcare Hamilton gained control and has been operating as the Margaret and Charles Juravinski Centre under the auspices of St. Joseph’s Healthcare Hamilton.

Programmes at this McMaster University Campus contribute to a reduction in disability and the stigma that often comes attached to diagnosis of mental illness or addiction.

West 5th (based on the street the hospital occupies), as it is colloquially known, concentrates on early intervention, outreach services, rehabilitation, recovery and integration into the community.

Services
Included in the healthcare offered at Juravinski Centre are Concurrent Disorders Program; Men's Addiction Service Hamilton (MASH); Peter Boris Centre for Addictions Research; and the Womankind Addiction Service.

Mental health services available include:
Acute Psychiatry
Anxiety Treatment and Research Clinic (ATRC)
Bridge To Recovery Program
COAST
Mobile Crisis Rapid Response Team (MCRRT)
Community Psychiatry Clinic
Consultation-Liaison Psychiatry Service
Developmental Dual Diagnosis Program
East Region Mental Health Services (ERMHS)
Eating Disorders Program
Emergency Psychiatry Services
Forensic Psychiatry Program
Mental Health and Wellness Resource Centre
Mood Disorders Program
Psychology Residency Program
Clinical Practicum Placements
Schizophrenia & Community Integration Service (SCIS)
Seniors Mental Health Service
Miss You Most Photography Exhibit
Psychology Month
Women's Health Concerns Clinic (WHCC)
Youth Wellness Centre

Other facilities 
The centre includes a library dedicated to Pope Francis; a salon; fitness and physio recovery centres; museum; a thrift shop; a cafe and restaurant staffed by survivors of mental illness; a Tim Hortons and an auditorium and conference rooms for events.

Patients of the Margaret and Charles Juravinski Centre can attend Mohawk College nearby, with the assistance of vocational therapy.

See also
 Bruce Trail
 Niagara Escarpment
 Auchmar house, one time home of Isaac Buchanan, business leader, political figure of Upper Canada
 Mohawk College
 St. Joseph's Healthcare Hamilton

References

Psychiatric hospitals in Ontario
Hospitals established in 1876